The Filoil EcoOil Preseason Cup (previously known as the Filoil Flying V Preseason Cup) is a pre-season collegiate basketball tournament in the Philippines. It is organized by Filoil EcoOil Sports. It gathers teams mainly from the University Athletic Association of the Philippines (UAAP) and the National Collegiate Athletic Association (NCAA), but also include some invited teams such as the RP Youth under-18 team and teams from other leagues, in a basketball tournament just before the start of the collegiate season.

History
The tournament was organized by the Filoil Flying V Sports team of the Villavicencio Group of Companies. It was first held as a post-season tournament in 2006 where it was known as the Homegrown Invitational Cup. Starting in 2007, Filoil Flying V Sports decided to hold it every summer and it was subsequently renamed as the Filoil Flying V Preseason Cup. The De La Salle Green Archers won the first two editions of the tournament. The UE Red Warriors won the third edition of the tournament in 2008, followed by the FEU Tamaraws in 2009, and the San Sebastian Stags in 2010. The tournament has been aired on television by coverage partner, ABS-CBN Sports, through ABS-CBN Sports+Action until 2016. Following a year without its coverage partner for the 2017 season, the tournament was returned to television this time on ESPN5 through The 5 Network and AksyonTV for the 2018 season. The 2020 and 2021 seasons of the tournament were cancelled due to the COVID-19 pandemic. Prior to the resumption of the tournament with its 15th season in 2022, it was rebranded as the Filoil EcoOil Preseason Cup.

Tournament format
Its format consists of dividing the teams into two groups featuring single round robin elimination games among teams of the same group to determine the playoff teams. The playoffs feature a crossover format, with the top seeds of each group facing off against the fourth seed of their opposites and the second seeds slugging it out with the opposite side's third seeds until a champion is determined.

Tournament results

Per tournament

Per school

See also
 College basketball in the Philippines
 List of Philippine men's collegiate basketball champions

References

External links
 Samahang Basketbol ng Pilipinas
 Filoil Flying V Sports
 Filoil Flying V Basketball Statistics

 
Recurring sporting events established in 2007
College men's basketball competitions in the Philippines